Sheena Yvette Castro Halili-Manzanero (born January 16, 1987) is a Filipino actress, host, and businesswoman. She is best known for her portrayals as a sidekick to protagonists or antagonists in hit television series.

Career
Halili entered Philippine showbusiness through the first wave of StarStruck, the reality-based star search of GMA Network. She was one of finalists, dubbed as the Final 14. Halili, together with those who were eliminated during the course of the show, are now known as Starstruck Batch 1 Avengers. She was linked with her co-survivor Rainier Castillo but it was later confirmed that they really dated after the show. She also starred in a commercial for Head & Shoulders where she was partnered with Alvin Aragon.

She considers her role in the highly acclaimed remake series MariMar (2007) as her biggest break on television. She played the role of Monica, the oppressive and ditzy best friend of Angelika, portrayed by Katrina Halili. While Katrina's character never improved, Sheena's villain role turned good in the end. After Marimar, Halili would star in another number of remake TV Series such as LaLola (2007) as the antagonist Vicky, Ako si Kim Sam Soon (2008) as Cynthia, Zorro (2009) as the recurring Lena, Rosalinda (2009) as the titular protagonist's best friend Becky, and in Full House (2009). 

She starred as Pepper, her first lead role, in an episode of SRO Cinemaserye called, Reunion with Jennica Garcia.

Halili had her first Christian telemovie, Tanikala: Ang Ikalawang Libro with her StarStruck co-alumni, Mike Tan. It aired on GMA Network, and was co-produced by CBN Asia in Holy Week 2010.

From 2011 to 2013, Halili became one of the news anchors in a defunct comedy news program, May Tamang Balita, which aired every Thursday night on GMA News TV (formerly QTV 11). She also played a major supporting characters in historical-cultural epic, Amaya (2011).

StarStruck

Personal life 
On August 26, 2018, Halili was engaged to Jeron Manzanero, a lawyer. They married on February 23, 2020. In June 2020, Halili announced that she and Manzanero and were expecting their first child. Their daughter, Martina, was born on December 13, 2020.

Filmography

Television

Film

Other

Accolades

References

External links
Sheena Halili's profile at Sparkle

Sheena Halili on Twitter

1987 births
Living people
People from San Fernando, Pampanga
Actresses from Pampanga
Kapampangan people
Filipino evangelicals
Filipino child actresses
Filipino film actresses
Filipino television actresses
Converts to evangelical Christianity from Roman Catholicism
Participants in Philippine reality television series
StarStruck (Philippine TV series) participants
GMA Network personalities